David Weintraub may refer to:

 David Weintraub (official) (1904–1969), official of the government of the United States
 David Weintraub (physicist), astrophysicist and astronomy professor